Brianna Buentello (born September 21, 1989) is an American politician who is a former member of the Colorado House of Representatives. A Democrat, she represented the 47th district, which includes parts of Fremont and Pueblo counties and all of Otero County, for one term. She served on the Rural Affairs and Agriculture Committee, and was the vice-chair of the Education Committee.

She is married to state legislator Nick Hinrichsen. In 2022, the couple were important supporters of Adam Frisch in his campaign for US House of Representatives.

Political career
Buentello was elected in the general election on November 6, 2018, winning 50.5 percent of the vote over 49.5 percent of Republican candidate Don Bendell. She succeeded Judy Reyher, who was appointed to the position when Clarice Navarro, the previous incumbent, was appointed to serve in the Trump Administration.

In the November 2020 general election, Buentello was defeated by Republican challenger Stephanie Luck. Luck garnered 54.15% of the vote to Buentello's 45.85%.

References

Democratic Party members of the Colorado House of Representatives
21st-century American politicians
Living people
People from Pueblo, Colorado
Northern Michigan University alumni
21st-century American women politicians
Women state legislators in Colorado
1989 births